Chauncey McPherson (January 29, 1892 – May 4, 1977) was an American fencer. He competed in the individual and team sabre events at the 1924 Summer Olympics.

References

External links
 

1892 births
1977 deaths
American male sabre fencers
Olympic fencers of the United States
Fencers at the 1924 Summer Olympics
Fencers from Philadelphia